Elmgren is a surname. Notable people with the surname include:

Kurt Elmgren (born 1943), Swedish wrestler
Samuel Elmgren (1771–1834), Finnish painter
Stefan Elmgren (born 1974), Swedish guitarist 

Surnames of Scandinavian origin